Cornale e Bastida is a comune in the province of Pavia, in Lombardy, northern Italy, that was formed on 4 February 2014 from the merger of the comuni Cornale and Bastida de' Dossi.

References

Cities and towns in Lombardy